Sir Craig Collins Reedie  (born 6 May 1941) is a Scottish sports administrator, noteworthy as the former president of the World Anti-Doping Agency, a former chairman of the British Olympic Association (1992–2005) and a vice-president of, and a serving representative on, the International Olympic Committee.

Background 

Reedie was born in Stirling, in Scotland, in 1941.  He was educated at Stirling High School, a comprehensive state school and the University of Glasgow. He gained his Master of Arts (MA) in 1962 and then studied for a Bachelor of Laws (LLB) degree in 1964, still at the University of Glasgow, but never completed or graduated in this course.

In his professional career, Reedie was a partner in a Scottish independent financial advisory company.

He is married and has two children. He still has a home in his native Scotland.

Sports administration 
In his sporting life, Reedie gained success playing badminton from 1962 to 1970, culminating in becoming a doubles champion. At the time, badminton was not recognised as an Olympic sport, a situation his influence was able to remedy in 1985, leading to the first medals being awarded at the 1992 Summer Olympics.

After his success as a player, Reedie turned his efforts towards sports administration and from 1981 to 1984 he was President of the International Badminton Federation (IBF). In 1992, he became the Chairman of the British Olympic Association (BOA), serving in that capacity for more than a decade, and for which role he was knighted on retiring in 2005. In 1994, in addition to his British role, Reedie joined the International Olympic Committee (IOC), where he is currently one of four United Kingdom representatives, the others being the Princess Royal, Sir Philip Craven and Adam Pengilly.

In addition to his post on the IOC, Reedie was also on the board of the London 2012 Organising Committee, the body tasked with preparing for the 2012 Summer Olympics that were held in London. He was also appointed to the Board of the Olympic Lottery Distributor in 2006. Reedie also served on the Evaluation Commission for the bids for the 2016 Summer Olympics which was won by Rio de Janeiro.  He also led the Evaluation Commission for the 2020 Summer Olympics that were awarded to Tokyo over Istanbul and Madrid, the three remaining cities on a shortlist that previously included Baku, Doha and Rome.

On 9 October 2009, at the 121st IOC Session in Copenhagen, after two previous failed attempts, Reedie was elected to the International Olympic Committee's executive board. He is the first Briton to have a seat on the board since 1961. He became a vice-president of the IOC in July 2012.

Beyond his involvement in the Olympic movement, Reedie has been involved in the World Anti-Doping Agency since its foundation in 1999, serving as the inaugural chair of WADA's Finance and Administration Committee and as a member of its executive committee and Foundation Board. In November 2013 Reedie was elected as WADA's third president, commencing his three-year term on 1 January 2014.

Honours 
Reedie was first appointed Commander of the Order of the British Empire (CBE) in the 1999 New Year Honours for services to sport.

In the 2006 New Year Honours he gained further recognition, with the award of a knighthood, again for services to sport, giving him the formal title of Sir Craig Reedie, CBE.

Reedie was also awarded an honorary degree by the University of Lincoln in the 2010 Graduation ceremonies.

In 2001 his life's achievements were recognised with an honorary doctorate from the University of Glasgow, and in 2005 Scotland's oldest university, the University of St Andrews made him an honorary Doctor of Law (LLD).

In the 2018 Queen's Birthday Honours, he was appointed Knight Grand Cross of the Order of the British Empire (GBE) for services to sport.

References

External links
Profile as a member of the IOC
Profile in The Gazetteer for Scotland
 Bwfbadminton.org

1941 births
Living people
Sportspeople from Stirling
People educated at Stirling High School
Alumni of the University of Glasgow
People associated with the University of Lincoln
People associated with the University of St Andrews
Scottish male badminton players
International Olympic Committee members
World Anti-Doping Agency members
Knights Bachelor
People in sports awarded knighthoods
British sports executives and administrators
Knights Grand Cross of the Order of the British Empire
Badminton executives and administrators